Ciro Panico (born 3 August 1999) is an Italian professional footballer who plays as a left back for  club Feralpisalò on loan from Cosenza.

Career
Born in Naples, Panico started his career in Serie D club Gragnano, he was promoted to the first team in 2016–17 season.

In 2017, he moved to Serie D club Potenza. He won the promotion to Serie C on his first year. Panico made his professional debut on 16 September 2018 against Catanzaro.  He left the club in 2021, played three Serie C seasons.

In August 2021, he signed with Serie B club Cosenza.

On 25 January 2022, he signed with Serie C club Juve Stabia.

On 10 January 2023, Panico moved on loan to Feralpisalò for the rest of the season.

References

External links
 
 

1999 births
Living people
Footballers from Naples
Italian footballers
Association football fullbacks
Serie C players
Serie D players
Serie B players
Potenza Calcio players
Cosenza Calcio players
S.S. Juve Stabia players
FeralpiSalò players